Alexandros Tsoltos (born February 14, 1979) is a Greek former swimmer, who specialized in freestyle events. Tsoltos qualified only for the men's 4×100 m freestyle relay, as a member of the Greek team, at the 2004 Summer Olympics in Athens. Teaming with Aristeidis Grigoriadis, Andreas Zisimos, and Spyridon Bitsakis in heat two, Tsoltos swam a second leg and recorded a split of 51.03, but the Greeks settled only for seventh place and fourteenth overall in a final time of 3:24.26.

References

External links
2004 Olympic Profile – Eideisis Ellinika 

1979 births
Living people
Greek male swimmers
Olympic swimmers of Greece
Swimmers at the 2004 Summer Olympics
Greek male freestyle swimmers
Swimmers from Athens